Aper may refer to:

People
 Aper (grammarian), 1st century Greek grammarian
 Marcus Aper, 1st century Roman orator
 Trosius Aper, 2nd century Roman grammarian and Latin tutor to Marcus Aurelius
 Gaius Septimius Severus Aper (ca. 175–211/212), Roman consul
 Lucius Flavius Aper (d. 284), Roman soldier, acting governor and Praetorian prefect
 Arrius Aper (died 284), praetorian prefect and father-in-law of emperor Numerian
 Aprus of Toul (d. 507), bishop of Toul
 Aprus of Sens (fl. 7th century), French saint
 Aper Aku (1938–1988), Nigerian politician
 Khnko Aper, pen name of Armenian writer and poet Atabek Khnkoyan (1870–1935)

Music
 The Apers, a Dutch pop punk band

Other
Apir, a traditional folding hand fan of the Maranao people of the Philippines.

See also
 Aprus (disambiguation)